XHCDM-TDT is a digital-only television station licensed to Mexico City, transmitting on channel 21 from Cerro del Chiquihuite. Branded as Capital 21, it is owned by the Government of Mexico City.

It is one of the newest stations in Mexico City; while the government had worked for years to build a station (which, had it signed on in analog, might have been channel 36, 38 or 42), it received its permit on February 22, 2010, and it signed on in 2012.

Programming
Programming on XHCDM includes cultural and entertainment programming aimed at the general Mexico City area. XHCDM also has several local newscasts that air on weekdays: a 7am newscast entitled Metrópoli 21 and two newscasts titled A Tiempo 21, one at 2:30pm and the other at 9pm. It also carries news programs from Deutsche Welle, typical of other state networks.

Digital subchannels

In 2015, XHCDM's digital signal was multiplexed for the first time. A subchannel 21.2 was added, with coverage of the Legislative Assembly of the Federal District. It was retitled "Ciudad TV, Canal de la Asamblea" after a 2016 name change. The name has since been updated to "Ciudad TV, Canal del Congreso de la Ciudad de México" after the 2018 Mexico City Constitution was adopted.

References

External links

Ciudad TV website

Television stations in Mexico City
Public television in Mexico
Spanish-language television stations in Mexico
2010 establishments in Mexico